Ma Hongbin (Xiao'erjing: , September 14, 1884 – October 21, 1960), was a prominent Chinese Muslim warlord active mainly during the Republican era, and was part of the Ma clique. He was the acting Chairman of Gansu and Ningxia Provinces for a short period.

Life 

Ma was born in the village of Hanchiachi, in Linxia County, Gansu. He was the son of Ma Fulu who died in 1900 when fighting against the foreigners in the Battle of Peking (1900) in the Boxer Rebellion. As a nephew of Ma Fuxiang, he followed him and later Feng Yuxiang into the army. He and Ma Fuxiang protected a Catholic mission in Sandaohe from attacks by the Gelaohui, and he received the Order of Leopold (Belgium) ("King Leopold decoration") During an uprising in Gansu in the Central Plains War, the Muslim General Ma Tingxiang was attacked by Ma Hongbin who was serving in Feng's administration in Ningxia.

Upon his cooperation with Chiang Kai-shek, he was named commander of the 22nd Division, 24th Army, within the National Revolutionary Army. He was governor of Ningxia from 1921 to 1928 and chairman of the government of Ningxia in 1930. However, Ma Hongbin caused and consequently lost a power struggle with his cousin Ma Hongkui, a fact that was exploited by Chiang Kai-shek to his own advantage by preventing Hongbin's total defeat. In 1930, Chiang named Ma Hongbin as the Chairman of the Provincial Council of Gansu, a post he held until 1931; Hongbin's control over Gansu remained very limited, however, as the province was mostly ruled by his rival Ma Zhongying. Even after Zhongying's departure to the Soviet Union in July 1934, Gansu's armies and civilian population was still loyal to Zhongying. Hongbin helped Ma Hongkui to fight off an invasion of Ningxia by fellow warlord Sun Dianying in early 1934.

The Japanese  planned to invade Ningxia from Suiyuan in 1939 and create a Hui Muslim puppet state. The next year in 1940, the Japanese were defeated militarily by Ma Hongbin, who caused the plan to collapse. Ma Hongbin's Hui Muslim troops launched further attacks against Japan in the Battle of West Suiyuan.

He became the commander of the 81st Corps during the Second Sino-Japanese War and World War II. In 1940 Ma Hongbin's Muslim troops took part in the Battle of West Suiyuan against Japan and their Mongol puppet state Mengjiang. In the same year at the Battle of Wuyuan, Ma Hongbin led the 81st Corps against the Japanese. The Japanese were defeated by the Chinese Muslim forces and Wuyuan was retaken. Japan used poison gas against the Chinese Muslim armies at the Battle of Wuyuan and Battle of West Suiyuan. Throughout the war, Ma Hongbin continued military operations against the Japanese and their Mongolian allies.

Ma Hongbin's army was clan centered and feudal. In his 81st corps, his chief of staff was his brother in law, Ma Chiang-liang.

The American Asiatic Association reported that he commanded the eighty fourth Army corps.

After the war, he became a senior adviser within the Northwestern Army Headquarters. When his cousin Ma Hongkui resigned from his positions and fled to Taiwan, those positions where transferred to Ma Hongbin. In 1949 during the Chinese Civil War, when the People's Liberation Army was approaching the northwest, Ma Hongbin and his son Ma Dunjing led his 81st Corps to cross over to the communist side. He was named vice-chairman (later restyled vice-governor) of Gansu province. He was also vice-director of the Commission of Ethnic Affairs as well as a member of the National Defense Commission of the People's Republic of China.  He died in Lanzhou in 1960.

Family 

Ma Hongbin's father was Ma Fulu, and his cousin was Ma Hongkui. His uncles were Ma Fuxiang, Ma Fushou, and Ma Fucai. His grandfather was Ma Qianling.

Ma Hongkui's son was General Ma Dunjing (1906–1972), three of his nephews were Generals Ma Dunhou (Ma Tun-hou, misspelled as Ma Tung-hou) 馬敦厚, Ma Dunjing (1910–2003), and Ma Dunren (Ma Tun-jen) 馬敦仁.

Career
1921 - 1928 Governor of Ningxia Province
1928 - ? Commander of the 22nd Division
1930 - Chairman of the Government of Ningxia Province
1930 - 1931 Chairman of the Provincial Council of Gansu
1938 - 1945 General Officer Commanding 81st Corps
1940 - 1941 Commander in Chief 17th Army Group
 Deputy Commander- in-chief of the XVnth Group Army

See also
 Ma clique

References

External links
 Rulers
 民国军阀派系谈 (The Republic of China warlord cliques discussed ) http://www.2499cn.com/junfamulu.htm
 Ma Hongbin

1884 births
1960 deaths
Ma clique
Republic of China warlords from Gansu
National Revolutionary Army generals from Gansu
Chinese Nationalist military figures
Members of the Kuomintang
Chinese military personnel of World War II
Chinese Muslims
Governors of Gansu
People from Linxia